Joe Millican (25 April 1855 – 10 August 1934) was an Australian politician. He was the Opposition member for Charters Towers in the Legislative Assembly of Queensland from 1907 to 1908.

Millican died in 1934 and is buried at Rookwood Cemetery.

References

1855 births
1934 deaths
Members of the Queensland Legislative Assembly
Place of birth missing
People from Allendale, Northumberland